Joe Stapleton is an American poker commentator. He has been an active commentator since 2009, and currently works for PokerStars. Stapleton did numerous broadcasts for the European Poker Tour.

In 2011, Joe Stapleton was living in Los Angeles but working in Europe, flying to London twice a month, before living in England for three-and-a-half years. He then moved back to New York for one year, and he has been travelling back to Los Angeles since 2016.

Commentator 
Joe Stapleton works for PokerStars, commentating both live and online events—especially during COVID-19, including events such as SCOOP—with the likes of Maria Ho and Joe Ingram.

Comedy 
In a May 2021 interview, Joe Stapleton mentioned the fact that he had a voice problem during the summer of 2020, preventing him for doing any comedy bits. He had to undergo surgery to fix this in February 2021.

Awards 
Along with fellow poker commentator James Hartigan, Stapleton was the recipient of the, 'Best Podcast' award at the 2022 Globe Poker Awards, for their show "Poker in the Ears".

References

American gambling writers
American male non-fiction writers
Living people
Poker commentators
Year of birth missing (living people)